The 1958 World Fencing Championships were held in Philadelphia, United States.

Medal table

Medal summary

Men's events

Women's events

References

FIE Results

World Fencing Championships
F
1958 in sports in Pennsylvania
1950s in Philadelphia
Sports competitions in Philadelphia
1958 in fencing
1958 in American sports